Romina Lozano Saldaña (born November 6, 1996) is a Peruvian model and beauty pageant titleholder who won Miss Peru 2018 on October 29, 2017, and represented Peru at Miss Universe 2018 pageant.

Personal life
Lozano was born in the district of Bellavista, in the city of San Martin Region in Peru. She is currently living in Lima. She graduated from Commercial Aviation and doing her second degree in Nutrition Science.

Pageantry

Elite Model Look Peru 2016
Lozano participate in the Elite Model Model Look Peru 2016, where they choose a model to represent Peru in the international Elite Model Look contest, competing without success.

Miss Callao 2017
Lozano competed in Miss Callao 2017, which was held on the night of February 18, 2017, where she won and was crowned by Valeria Piazza, the Miss Peru 2016.

Miss Perú 2018
Like Miss Callao 2017, she represented Callao in the Miss Peru 2018, which was held at the Municipal Theater of Lima, on October 29, 2017, whose event became the most controversial Miss Peru platform, where promotes the opposition of violence against women, with an average of 23 candidates announcing the measures of daily violence suffered by women in Peru. Finally Lozano was the winner and was crowned by outgoing Prissila Howard of Piura, Miss Peru 2017.

Miss Universe 2018
As Miss Peru 2018, Lozano competed at the Miss Universe 2018 pageant but was not placed in the Top 20.

Miss Charm 2021 
As miss charm Peru 2021, Lozano competing in Miss charm international 2021 which was held ing on October 11, at  Vietnam

References

External links
MissPeruOficial
missuniverse.com
Romina Lozano

Living people
People from San Martín Region
People from Callao
1996 births
Peruvian female models
Miss Universe 2018 contestants
Peruvian beauty pageant winners
Peruvian child models